Sir Richard Lloyd (23 February 1606 – 5 May 1676) was an English politician who sat in the House of Commons at various times between 1628 and 1676. He fought for the Royalist army in the English Civil War.

Early life 
Lloyd was the eldest son of Evan Lloyd of Dulasau, Penmachno, Caernarvonshire and his wife Janet ap Ieuan, daughter of Roderick ap Ieuan of Pennarth, Llanystumdwy, Caernarvonshire. He entered Gray's Inn in 1618 and attended  Wadham College, Oxford, where he was awarded BA in 1624. He succeeded to the estates of his father in 1626. In 1628, he was elected Member of Parliament for Montgomery and sat until 1629 when King Charles decided to rule without parliament for eleven years. He was called to the bar in 1635 and was Reader of Barnard's Inn in 1639.

Political career 
In April 1640, Lloyd was elected MP for Newcastle-under-Lyme in the Short Parliament.  He was attorney-general for North Wales from 1640 to 1647. On the outbreak of the civil war he was commissioner of array for Denbighshire and Radnorshire in 1642 and was knighted on 7 October 1642. From 1642 to 1647 he was colonel of dragoons in the Royalist army. He was governor of Holt Castle from 1645 to 1647 and under his command, the castle held out  longer than any other garrison except Harlech. He was given very favourable terms on surrender and was allowed to go into exile while his estate was granted to his wife. He settled at Calais and took no part in royalist activities and returned at the Restoration.

Lloyd resumed his position as attorney-general for North Wales in July 1660, and remained to 1671. He was chief justice of the Brecon circuit and a J.P. for Breconshire, Caernarvonshire, Denbighshire, Glamorgan and Radnorshire from July 1660 until his death. He was commissioner  for assessment for Denbighshire and Caernarvonshire from August 1660 and commissioner  for assessment for Glamorgan and Merioneth from 1661 until his death. He was commissioner  for assessment for Radnorshire from 1661 to 1663. In 1661, being chief justice of the circuit, he was elected MP for both Cardiff  and Radnorshire and chose to sit for Radnorshire in the Cavalier Parliament. He was a commissioner for loyal and indigent officers for Caernarvonshire, Denbighshire, Merioneth and Radnorshire in 1662 and commissioner  for assessment for Radnorshire and commissioner  for assessment for Breconshire from 1665. He was Deputy Lieutenant for Denbighshire from 1674.

Death 
Lloyd died at the age of  70.

Lloyd married  Margaret Sneyd, daughter of Ralph Sneyd of Keele, Staffordshire on 24 September 1632. He had a son and three daughters.

References

1606 births
1676 deaths
Members of the Parliament of England (pre-1707) for constituencies in Wales
Cavaliers
Members of Gray's Inn
Alumni of Wadham College, Oxford
People from Montgomeryshire
Members of the Parliament of England for Newcastle-under-Lyme
English MPs 1628–1629
English MPs 1640 (April)
English MPs 1661–1679
17th-century Welsh judges